The Mercury Phoenix Trust is a charity organisation that fights HIV/AIDS worldwide.

After the death of Queen singer Freddie Mercury from AIDS-related causes in London in 1991, the remaining members of the band and Jim Beach, their manager, organised The Freddie Mercury Tribute Concert for AIDS Awareness, the proceeds of which were used to launch The Mercury Phoenix Trust. The organisation has been active ever since.

The current Trustees are: Brian May, Roger Taylor, Jim Beach, and Mercury's former fiance Mary Austin.

References

External links 
www.mercuryphoenixtrust.com - Official website

HIV/AIDS activism
Health charities in the United Kingdom
Queen (band)